Meichuan is a town in Min County, Gansu, China. It was heavily hit by the 2013 Dingxi earthquakes. The town has historically been an important production location and marketplace for Traditional Chinese medicine such as angelica, dangshen, and astragalus.

References 

Township-level divisions of Gansu
Dingxi